Aghabeyim agha Javanshir (1780–1832) was an Azerbaijani poet, daughter of the second khan of Karabakh Ibrahim Khalil Khan, a wife of Iranian shah Fath-Ali Shah Qajar, and aunt of poet Khurshidbanu Natavan. She wrote under the alias Aghabaji.

Early life
In her younger years, Aghabeyim agha fell in love with her cousin Muhammad bey when she was young. Muhammad bey was in charge of her father the khan's army. Returning to Shusha to Ibrahim Khalil khan for the settlement of the marriage issue, Muhammad bey had to go on a trip on that day. Aghabeyim agha wrote on this occasion:

After Agha Mohammad Khan Qajar's homicide in Karabakh, in 1797, Ibrahim Khalil Khan married his daughter Aghabeyim agha to new the shah, Agha Mohammad Khan's nephew Fath-Ali Shah Qajar to ensure the normalization of political relations and sent her to Tehran.

Life as a royal consort
Fath-Ali Shah's wives had a right to choose any dress from the shah's rich salon when they entered into harem. Aghabeyim agha knew that the shah's mother's dress was also there. Therefore, when she was brought to the salon she directed her steps to that dress and put it on. Seeing Aghabeyim agha in his mother's dress, Fath-Ali Shah was surprised and never touched her.

Due to her intellect, Aghabeyim agha was liked by the shah, and he appointed her as harem's head wife and granted her gorgeous dresses with pearls.

Aghabeyim agha was homesick and expressed her anguish in her poems-bayati (quatrains):

Aghabeyim agha died in 1832, in Tehran and was buried in Qom.

Aghabeyim agha in art
In 2008, a film Sovereign's Fortune was shot about the history of Karabakh khanate during Ibrahim Khalil Khan's reign. The role of Aghabeyim agha was played by Gunash Aliyeva.

References

1780 births
1832 deaths
Azerbaijani-language women poets
Writers from Shusha
Qajar royal consorts
18th-century Iranian poets
19th-century Iranian women writers
18th-century Iranian women